Codrongianos (Codronzànu or Codronzànos in Sardinian language) is a comune (municipality) in the Province of Sassari in the Italian region Sardinia, located about  north of Cagliari and about  southeast of Sassari.

Codrongianos borders the following municipalities: Cargeghe, Florinas, Osilo, Ploaghe, Siligo.

Main sights
Basilica di Saccargia, one of the most renowned Romanesque churches in Sardinia.
 Static inverter plant of HVDC SACOI, the HVDC-power cable connecting the power grids of Corse and Sardinia with the grid of the Italian mainland.

People
 Blessed Elisabetta Sanna (full name Elisabetta Sanna Porcu) (1788–1857)

References

External links
 Official website

Cities and towns in Sardinia